Mericitabine (RG-7128) is an antiviral drug, a deoxycytidine analog (a type of nucleoside analog). It was developed as a treatment for hepatitis C, acting as a NS5B RNA polymerase inhibitor, but while it showed a good safety profile in clinical trials, it was not sufficiently effective to be used as a stand-alone agent. However mericitabine has been shown to boost the efficacy of other antiviral drugs when used alongside them, and as most modern treatment regimens for hepatitis C use a combination therapy of several antiviral drugs, clinical trials have continued to see if it can form a part of a clinically useful drug treatment program.

See also 
 BCX4430
 MK-608
 NITD008
 Valopicitabine

References 

Anti–RNA virus drugs
Antiviral drugs
Nucleosides
Isobutyrate esters
Pyrimidones
NS5B (polymerase) inhibitors